Syllepte amelialis is a moth in the family Crambidae. It was described by Viette in 1957. It is found on São Tomé.

References

Moths described in 1957
amelialis
Taxa named by Pierre Viette
Moths of Africa